III is the third studio album by electronic trio Moderat. It was released on April 1, 2016. III is the third installment to Moderat's album trilogy that includes Moderat and II.

This was Moderat's final studio album before their indefinite hiatus at the end of their Berlin Tour in September 2017.

Track listing

Charts

Year-end charts

References 

2016 albums
Moderat albums
Sequel albums